Oneta is a small unincorporated community in Wagoner County in the U.S. state of Oklahoma. The post office opened July 7, 1905, and closed November 30, 1922.

Near Oneta is the Tulsa Tower Joint Venture broadcast tower, a cable-stayed VHF/UHF television transmission tower (also used for cellphone signals) with a height of 559 meters (some sources say 560.5 meters).

References

External links

Unincorporated communities in Wagoner County, Oklahoma
Unincorporated communities in Oklahoma